Sony released the following E-mount cameras since 2010. The E stands for the Eighteen mm flange distances of the E-mount cameras.  Depending on type and model E-mount cameras are part of the Sony α, SmartShot, Handycam, NXCAM or XDCAM systems.

List of Sony E-mount cameras:

See also
List of Sony E-mount lenses
List of Sony α cameras
List of Sony A-mount cameras

References

</noinclude>